Appachcha Kavi (born 21 September 1868, d. circa 1930) was an Indian poet and playwright. He belonged to the Kodava community. He is known as the first playwright in the Kodava language.

Early life

Appachcha (also spelt: Appacha) was born in the village Kirundaadu, about 15 km to the south of Madikeri in Kodagu district, Karnataka. Kirundaadu is a small village of erstwhile Napoklu Naadu. Presently Napoklu is a small town in Madikeri taluk. It is about 15 km to the south of Madikeri, the district headquarters, located in the northern part of Kodagu. His parents were Medayya and Bollavva of the Appaneravanda family. His mother was from the Kabbachchira family in Arji village, near Virajpet, in the southern part of Kodagu district. Humble farmers, they were pious and particularly interested in music. Appachcha was the only son, he had three sisters. As a child, Appachcha was soft spoken and kind, spending much of his time in writing and singing devotional songs. Because there was no school in his native village, Appachcha was sent to live with his maternal uncle in Arji, a village near Virajpet. Here, he studied up to third standard, learning the basics of the Kannada language and of arithmetic.

Career

At a young age he began to earn for his livelihood. He first joined the Virajpet Naad Cutchery (Government Office) as an volunteer. Then he worked in the police department for some time, after which he found a position in the Omkaaresvara temple of Madikeri (Mercara) at a monthly wage of Rs 8. There he was acquainted with Venkatadri Shamarao, a man passionate about  music and drama. After about two years Appachcha was transferred to Bhagamandala as a Parupathyagara (temple supervisor), where he met Vaidyanatha Bhatta, a Vedic scholar. In his association, Appachcha was introduced to the study of the epics (Ramayana and  Mahabharata), and other Puranas (Indian mythologies) as well as Vedas. This way he obtained a religious education.

Around 1896, Appachcha was transferred back to Madikeri, where he was made the manager of the Gaddige(the erstwhile Rajas' mausoleum). Meanwhile he pursued his hobby and obtained a few small acting roles. A few years later, Appachcha's associate Venkatadri Shamarao started a drama company, here Appachcha was awarded a major role: that of the Raja in the play Chandrahasa by Ramarao.  In the period 1904–1906, Appachcha wrote his first three plays: Yayaathi Raajanda Naataka, Sree Subrahmanya Mahathmye, and Sathi Savithri, all in the Kodava language. In 1907, Appachcha was able to quit his supervisor position and devote himself to the arts.  He wrote a book, Sree Kaaveri Mahathmye. In 1908 he established a Kodava speaking drama company consisting of about 22 artists and toured Kodagu.

Because relatively few people speak the Kodava language, in 1909 Appachcha closed his original company and started a Kannada language drama company with artists from the neighboring district, Mysore.  His company toured Mysore, they toured places like Hunasuru, Periyapattana and Kandalavu, exhibiting plays written by him in Kannada, such as Virata Parva, Sati Sukanya, and Ghoshayathre. In 1910, Appachcha went back to his previous job at Bhagamandala, and hence most of his drama activities came to a standstill.  He retired from this post in 1917 at the age of 52.

In the year 1926, Appachcha's house was completely burned down by a fire. In order to overcome this tragedy Appachcha Kavi started the Kathakalakshepa.  It was from then onwards that he was known as Haradaasa Appachcha Kavi.

Legacy

Haradaasa Appacha Kavi was a devotee of Lord Shiva (That is why he used to write his name as Haradaasa, not Haridaasa). Yet, in his plays, the songs in praise of Krishna, such as, Kaapaad Sree Krishnane is as devotional as Thudipeno naa ninna Shivane, which is in praise of Shiva. Like traditional plays of those days his works also contain all the navarasas. The stories of his plays were taken from the Indian mythologies, but he cast his characters in Kodava ethos. The background of these plays were hence steeped in Kodava customs and culture and quite a few names of various trees, fruits, flowers, birds and animals of Kodagu were mentioned in his plays.

Appacha Kavi was a versatile person and unique in the field of drama. He was a playwright, actor, producer and director of dramas, a good singer and bard. He could be called Poet Laureate of Kodagu. He was the first and foremost playwright of Kodava language and though he wrote very few plays, each one them is monumental classic. His songs and ballads are still sung in Kodagu by young and old, and the audio cassettes and CDs are popular.

Main sources

Jagathigonde Kodagu, by K P Muththanna, 1969.
Kodavas, by B D Ganapathy, 1980.
A study of the Origin of Coorgs, by Lt Col K C Ponnappa (Rtd), 1999.

Indian male poets
Indian male dramatists and playwrights
19th-century Indian dramatists and playwrights
Kodava people
1868 births
1930 deaths
Kodava Takk
19th-century Indian poets
20th-century Indian poets
Dramatists and playwrights from Karnataka
19th-century Indian male writers
Poets from Karnataka
20th-century Indian male writers